Şərəfə (also, Sərəfə and Sharafa) is a village and municipality in the Masally Rayon of Azerbaijan.  It has a population of 2,154.

References 

Populated places in Masally District